The Chlyne Lohner (also spelled Klein Lohner) is a mountain of the Bernese Alps, located between the valleys of Adelboden and Kandersteg.

The Chlyne Lohner lies to the north of the Gross Lohner, from which it is separated by the Bunderchrinde Pass, which provides a hiking route between Adelboden and Kandersteg.

References

External links
 Chlyne Lohner on Hikr

Mountains of the Alps
Mountains of Switzerland
Mountains of the canton of Bern